Ezbaram is a village in Malfejan Rural District, in the Central District of Siahkal County, Gilan Province, Iran. At the 2006 census, its population was 416, in 131 families.

References 

Populated places in Siahkal County